Beware is the fifth release by the American punk rock band Misfits. First issued in January 1980, this EP combined the Misfits' previously released singles "Bullet" and "Horror Business", and was originally intended as a recording that the Misfits could bring with them on their tour of the United Kingdom with the British punk rock group the Damned in late 1979. Along with songs from "Bullet" and "Horror Business", Beware also includes the track "Last Caress", which had never been released previously.

Background
In November 1979, the Misfits flew to the United Kingdom for a six-date tour with the Damned. The Damned, having scheduled a different opening act for their tour, were not expecting their arrival, but the Misfits were added to the bill nonetheless. After not receiving any payment for performing, the Misfits soon cancelled their remaining appearances on the tour. This was followed by the arrest of Misfits vocalist Glenn Danzig and then-Misfits guitarist Bobby Steele, who had been involved in a fight with a group of skinheads at the Rainbow Theatre in London on December 2, 1979. Danzig and Steele spent two nights in jail in Brixton, England, which inspired them to create the song "London Dungeon".

Then-Misfits drummer Joey Image returned to the United States by himself on December 15, effectively quitting the band. On December 18, the other members of the group flew back to their home state of New Jersey, where they produced Beware. The title of the EP was derived from a series of road signs that the Misfits had come across while in London, which read "Beware Bollards". The band, unfamiliar with the term "bollard", initially thought that it might refer to a cryptid such as their own Jersey Devil. Originally planned as a record that the Misfits could bring with them on their tour with the Damned (they were not able to do so, as the cover artwork had not been completed in time), Beware combined songs from the Misfits' previously issued singles "Bullet" and "Horror Business", except the latter's track "Children in Heat" was replaced by the song "Last Caress", which had never been released prior to Beware.

Beware was the Misfits' only original UK release, and was issued in the UK by Armageddon/Spartan Records and in the U.S. by the band's own label, Plan 9 Records.

Track listing

Personnel

Band
 Glenn Danzig – vocals, guitar
 Jerry Only – bass, background vocals
 Franché Coma – guitar, background vocals (1978 session only)
 Mr. Jim – drums (1978 session only)
 Bobby Steele – guitar, background vocals (1979 session only)
 Joey Image – drums (1979 session only)

Production
 Dave Achelis – engineer

References

Sources
 
 

Misfits (band) EPs
Horror punk EPs
1980 debut EPs
Plan 9 Records EPs